Eder González Tortella (born 7 January 1997) is a Spanish professional footballer who plays as a midfielder for Super League Greece club Atromitos.

Career statistics

Club

Honours
Csíkszereda
Liga III: 2018–19

Sepsi OSK 
Cupa României: 2021–22

References

External links

1997 births
Living people
Footballers from Palma de Mallorca
Spanish footballers
Spanish expatriate footballers
Spanish expatriate sportspeople in Romania
Spanish expatriate sportspeople in Greece
Expatriate footballers in Romania
Expatriate footballers in Greece
Association football midfielders
RCD Mallorca B players
Terrassa FC footballers
UE Cornellà players
Segunda División B players
Tercera División players
Liga I players
Liga II players
Liga III players
Super League Greece players
FK Csíkszereda Miercurea Ciuc players
Sepsi OSK Sfântu Gheorghe players
Atromitos F.C. players